The Universal Zulu Nation is an international hip hop awareness group formed by and formerly led by hip hop artist Afrika Bambaataa.

The Universal Zulu Nation promotes the idea that hip-hop was created to sustain the ideals of "peace, love, unity and having fun" for all races, religions, nations, and civilizations.

History 
Originally known simply as the Organization, it arose in the 1970s from the reformed New York City gang the Black Spades, a street gang from the South Bronx. While the Black Spades were the base of the organization, other reformed gangs contributed additional members, notably the Savage Nomads, Seven Immortals, and Savage Skulls, among others. Members began to organize cultural events for youths, combining local dance and music movements into what would become known as the various elements of hip hop culture. Elements of the culture include Emceeing (MCing), Deejaying (DJing), breaking, and writing.

In many interviews, Afrika Bambaataa has spoken of the name "Zulu" as being inspired by the 1964 film of the same name.

The imagery of the Zulu Nation has varied at times as well. During the 1970s, and 1980s, Afrika Bambaataa and the Zulu Nation members would often clothe themselves in costumes representing different cultures of the world and different factions of the Nation throughout the world may utilize different cultural symbols and themes to express basic Zulu philosophy.

Since the early 1980s, the Zulu Nation has since established (autonomous) branches in Japan, France, the UK, Australia, Canada, South Korea and the Cape Flats in Cape Town South Africa.

From the late 1980s, at the height of the Afrocentric movement in hip-hop (when artists such as KRS-One, Public Enemy, A Tribe Called Quest, Native Tongues, and Rakim hit success), the movement seemed to be incorporating many doctrines from the Nation of Islam, the Nation of Gods and Earths, and the Nuwaubians. In the mid 1990s some members began to break off starting their own projects or organizations such as Ill Crew Universal.

Afrika Bambaataa stood down as head of the Zulu Nation in May 2016 after allegations of sexually abusing several young men and children in the organization. Ronald Savage was the first of several men to publicly accuse Bambaataa.

In 2017, hundreds of Zulus resigned due to distrust of the Zulu Nation and founded their own organization, the Zulu Union.

Zulu Nation in France
The Zulu movement was introduced to France in 1982 by Afrika Bambaataa when the New York City Rap Tour performed in several cities (Paris, Lyon, Metz, Belfort, Mulhouse) with artists PHASE 2, Futura 2000, Dondi, Grandmaster D.ST, the Rock Steady Crew, Rammellzee, the double dutch group Buffalo Girls. The Zulu Nation was centered in suburban Paris since most immigrants lived beyond the city limits. Since 1987, the Zulu Nation's ties to the French hip hop community have waned. Since Afrika Bambaataa's tour of France in 2008 and a Zulu Nation reunion in Paris, new movements of the Universal Zulu Nation have emerged in different cities in France.  According to Veronique Henelon, "French rap specifically has been a multi-dimensional expression of ties with Africa." The first hip-hop television show reportedly appeared in France. It was called 'H.I.P. H.O.P.' and was aired by the TF1 channel in 1984.

Notable members and affiliates

 Q-Tip
 Joeystarr
 Fab Five Freddy
 Ryuichi Sakamoto
 Kurtis Blow
 Spoonie Gee
 Rakaa
 Kool Moe Dee
 Ice-T
 King Sun XL
 Immortal Technique
 Big Boi
 Freddie Gibbs
 9th Wonder
 Lovebug Starski (deceased)
 Jam Master Jay (deceased)
 Phife Dawg (deceased)
 Lil Wayne
 Zulu King Flowrex
 DJ Fuze (UK)
 Donnie’s Dad
 MC Spice
 Mick Benzo
 Soul Messiah
 Bronx Style Bob

In popular culture
In 2004, the thirteenth episode of the second season of Chappelle's Show had the comedian Dave Chappelle do a sketch on an African-American George W. Bush, called Black Bush, where the character said that his coalition of the willing included Afrika Bambataa and the Zulu Nation.

The Universal Zulu Nation is featured at length in the 2016 Netflix series The Get Down.  In the series, Afrika Bambaataa is played by Nigerian-American actor Okieriete Onaodowan.

References

External links
 
 Universal Zulu Nation Holland
 Universal Zulu Nation Australia
 Universal Zulu Nation Malta
 "Zulu Nation: From Gang To Glory", by Davey D

History of hip hop
Musical subcultures
American hip hop groups
Social movements in the United States
Hip hop activists
Art movements